SWCC may refer to:

 Special warfare combatant-craft crewmen
 Second World Climate Conference
 Southwestern Christian College
 Saline Water Conversion Corporation
 Socialism with Chinese characteristics
 Star Wars Celebration Chicago